is a Japanese director and storyboard artist. He joined Satelight in 2005 as a production manager. In 2010, Yase joined Shaft as an episode director, and made his series directorial debut with Hidamari Sketch x Honeycomb.

Career
Yase began his career in the anime industry as a production manager with Satelight in 2005. He became an episode director with the studio and eventually left by the end of 2009. In 2010, he joined Shaft and directed two episodes of the Akiyuki Shinbo series And Yet the Town Moves. In 2012, under the chief direction of Shinbo, Yase debuted as a series director with Hidamari Sketch x Honeycomb, and the following year directed Onimonogatari and Koimonogatari (the final two arcs of Monogatari Series Second Season) under chief director Shinbo and director Tomoyuki Itamura. In 2014, Yase was given the directorial position for the anime adaptation of JIN's mixed-media project Kagerou Daze, and in 2016/2017 would direct his final series with Shaft: Kubikiri Cycle: The Beheading Cycle and the Blue Savant. The following year, he departed from Shaft, and in 2019 he directed the first season of Fire Force with David Production.

Works

Television series
 Highlights roles with series directorial duties.

OVAs
 Highlights roles with series directorial duties.

Films

Notes

References

External links
 
 

Anime directors
Living people
Year of birth missing (living people)